Esporte Clube Tigres do Brasil is a Brazilian football team from the city of Duque de Caxias, Rio de Janeiro state, founded on January 19, 2004.

History
The club was founded on January 19, 2004 as Esporte Clube Poland do Brasil due to a partnership with Poland Química, which is a chemical company. Esporte Clube Poland do Brasil was renamed to is current name, Esporte Clube Tigres do Brasil during the final months of 2004. The club, managed by Flávio Silva, won its first title in 2005, which was the Copa Rio. Tigres do Brasil competed in the Campeonato Carioca 2009 season.

Achievements
 Copa Rio: 2005, 2009

Stadium

Tigres do Brasil's home stadium is Estádio De Los Larios, inaugurated in 2009 and located in Xerém district, Duque de Caxias. It has a maximum capacity of 11,000 people. The club previously played at Estádio Giulite Coutinho, also known as Estádio Édson Passos, inaugurated in 2000, with a maximum capacity of 16,000 people.

Colors
The club's official colors are green, white and yellow.

Current squad

References

External links
—Official Esporte Clube Tigres do Brasil website

 
Duque de Caxias, Rio de Janeiro
Tigres do Brasil
2004 establishments in Brazil
Association football clubs established in 2004